Play It Cool is an album by vocalist Lea DeLaria.

Music and recording
This was her debut album for Warner Bros. Records. The 11 tracks are from contemporary musical theater. The arrangements were by Larry Goldings and Gil Goldstein, separately. She uses "several vocal techniques to bring each song to life, including scatting, elongated phrasing, swing, and balladeering".

Reception

The JazzTimes reviewer commented that "DeLaria is a worthy heir to the Broadway–Vegas axis. More important, she is a bracing-and very welcome-blast of fresh air."

Track listing
"The Ballad of Sweeney Todd"
"Cool"
"I've Got Your Number"
"With Every Breath I Take"
"All That Jazz"
"Life Has Been Good to Me"
"Welcome to My Party"
"Lowdown-Down"
"Once in a Lifetime"
"Losing My Mind"
"Straight to the Top"

Personnel
 Lea DeLaria – vocals
 Brad Mehldau – piano
 Larry Goldings – piano
 Gil Goldstein – piano, accordion
 Larry Grenadier – bass
 Gregory Hutchinson – drums
 Howard Alden – guitar
 Scott Wendholt – trumpet
 Jon Gordon – alto sax
 Seamus Blake – tenor sax

References

Warner Records albums
2001 albums
Lea DeLaria albums
Covers albums